D-Shape is a large 3-dimensional printer that uses binder-jetting, a layer by layer printing process, to bind sand with an inorganic seawater and magnesium-based binder in order to create stone-like objects. Invented by Enrico Dini, founder of Monolite UK Ltd, the first model of the D-Shape printer used epoxy resin, commonly used as an adhesive in the construction of skis, cars, and airplanes, as the binder. Dini patented this model in 2006. After experiencing problems with the epoxy, Dini changed the binder to the current magnesium-based one and patented his printer again in September 2008. In the future, Dini aims to use the printer to create full-scale buildings.

Technical description
The current version of the D-Shape 3-D printer sits in a 6m by 6m aluminum frame. The frame consists of a square base that moves upwards along four vertical beams during the printing process via stepper motors, which are used to repeatedly move a specified length and then hold in place, on each beam. Spanning the entire horizontal 6m of the base is a printer head with 300 nozzles, each spaced 20mm apart. The printer head is connected to the base by an aluminum beam that runs perpendicular to the printer head.

Process 
Before the actual printing process can begin, a 3-D model of the object to be printed must be created on CAD, a software that allows a designer to create 3-D models on a computer. Once the model is finished, the CAD file is sent to the printer head. The printing process begins when a layer of sand from 5 to 10 mm thick, mixed with solid magnesium oxide (MgO), is evenly distributed by the printer head in the area enclosed by the frame. The printer head breaks the 3-D model into 2-D slices. The binder and sand chemically react to form a sandstone material. It takes about 24 hours for the material to completely solidify. The material is resembling by composition the Sorel cement.

Because the nozzles are 20mm apart there are gaps that may need to be filled up. To fill in these gaps and ensure the sand is uniformly exposed to the binder, an electric piston on the beam that holds the printer head forces the printer head to shift in the direction perpendicular to the printer's direction of motion. It takes D-Shape four forward and backward strokes to finish printing a layer. After a layer is finished, the stepper motors on the vertical beams move the base upwards. From the hollow framework just above the printer head, new sand, which is cyclically refilled, is distributed into the area of the frame to create the next layer. During printing, excess sand acts as a support for the solidifying sand and can also be reused in later printings. The printing process is continuous and stops only when the desired structure is completely printed.

After the printer finishes its work, the final structure must be extruded from the sand. Workers use shovels to take out the excess sand and reveal the final product. The magnesium oxide mixed in with the sand causes the sand to become an active participant rather than inert during the reaction with the binder. If the sand was inert, the resulting material would be more like concrete in that the sand would be only slightly bound together, but because of the MgO, the final product is a mineral-like material with a microcrystalline structure. Compared to concrete, which has low resistance to tension and as a result needs iron reinforcement, D-Shape's structures have relatively high tension resistance and require no iron reinforcement. The entire building process is reported to take a quarter of the time and a third to a half of the cost  it would take to build the same structure with traditional means using portland cement, the material currently used in building construction.

Awards and achievements

NYC Waterfront Construction Competition
In the fall of 2012, D-Shape entered into the NYC Waterfront Construction Competition hosted by the New York City Economic Development Corporation (NYCEDC) in which competitors had to create an innovative solution to help strengthen New York City's deteriorating piers and coastline structures. D-Shape's idea, called, "Digital Concrete," was to take 3-D scans of each piece of pier or infrastructure, and then print a support jacket for each specific piece. D-Shape was the First Place Winner and received $50,000 for the idea, which is estimated to save New York City $2.9 billion.

Radiolaria
D-Shape successfully created the tallest printed sculpture, Radiolaria, in 2009. Radiolaria, a sculpture created by Italian architect Andrea Morgante and inspired by radiolarians, unicellular organisms with intricate mineral skeletons, shows off D-Shape's ability to print large freeform structures. The current version of the sculpture is only a 3 x 3 x 3m scale model of the full-size Radiolaria that is planned to be put in a roundabout in Pontedera, Italy.

Future of D-Shape 
Currently, Jake Wake-Walker and Marc Webb are working on a documentary, titled The Man Who Prints Houses, about Enrico Dini and his invention. Although D-Shape has garnered attention for its printing abilities, it is still a work in progress. While it has gotten close to printing an actual house by printing a trullo, which is a small, stone hut, the printer still needs to be modified in order to make Dini's dreams of printing larger and more complex buildings a reality.

Lunar bases
Because of D-Shape's capabilities, the European Space Agency (ESA) has taken interest in using the printer to build moon bases. The ESA is interested in using D-Shape to build moon bases out of lunar regolith, otherwise known as moon dust, because the 3-D printer can build the base onsite without human intervention. This is advantageous because only the machine would have to be taken to the moon, thus reducing the cost of bringing building materials to the lunar surface to create the bases. D-Shape has been successful in printing components for the lunar bases with a simulated moon dust, and has also been subject to tests that aim to see how the printer will work in the environment on the moon.

References

External links 
 Discovery Channel Covering D-Shape https://www.youtube.com/watch?v=RYaRUVTwIVc 

2006 introductions
Construction
Building technology